Rain chains (or , literally "chain-gutter") are alternatives to a downspout. They are widely used in Japan.  Their purpose is largely decorative, to make a water feature out of the transport of rainwater from the guttering downwards to a drain or to a storage container.  (Rainwater is sometimes collected for household usage.)  They can also be found on temples.

Rain chains are typically either a series of metal cups, chained together with a hole in the bottom of each, or chain links that span vertically. Rain water run-off gets distributed from a rooftop gutter downward through the rain chain.

Rain chains have also been used in the West. Nordic vernacular architecture often used a simple stick as a rainwater guide, in similar fashion. They have also been used in the Modernist era, to juxtapose metal chains with a concrete or Portland stone facade.

References

Further reading 
 

Artworks in metal
Plumbing
Roofs
Water